The following lists events that happened during 2014 in Algeria.

Incumbents
 President – Abdelaziz Bouteflika
 Prime Minister –
Abdelmalek Sellal (until 13 March)
Youcef Yousfi (Acting, 13 March-29 April)
Abdelmalek Sellal (from 29 April)

Events

February
 February 11 – A military transport plane crashed in a mountainous area of Oum El Bouaghi Province killing 77 people.

April
 April 17 – Voters in Algeria go to the polls for a presidential election with incumbent President Abdelaziz Bouteflika standing for a fourth term.

June
 June 25 – Egypt's president Abdel Fattah el-Sisi makes his first official visit abroad to Algeria where security was top of the agenda. Algeria agreed to ship five cargoes of liquefied natural gas to Egypt before the end of the year.

August
 August 1 – The 5.6  Algiers earthquake affected the north coast, causing 420 injuries and six deaths.
 August 30 – A Ukrainian Antonov An-12 aircraft with seven people on board crashes in the Sahara Desert.

September
 September 24 – Algerian jihadist group Jund al-Khilafah release a video showing French tourist Hervé Gourdel being killed because of French participation in airstrikes against ISIS.

References

 
2010s in Algeria
Years of the 21st century in Algeria
Algeria
Algeria